Ustoma (pronounced:  Us'-to-ma; variants:  Oostomas, Ustu) is a former Maidu village in Nevada County, California, that was located near Nevada City.

References

Former settlements in Nevada County, California
Former populated places in California
Maidu villages